Trypetimorpha is a genus of bugs in the family Tropiduchidae; species are recorded from mainland Europe, Africa, Asia and Australia.

Taxonomy
Trypetimorpha is the type genus of the small tribe Trypetimorphini (erected by Leopold Melichar in 1914).  The other extant genus in this tribe is Ommatissus and the extinct genus †Reteotissus Szwedo, 2019 was found from Eocene strata in the Isle of Wight, off southern England.

Species
Fulgoromorpha Lists on the Web includes:
 Trypetimorpha aschei Huang & Bourgoin, 1993
 Trypetimorpha biermani (Dammerman, 1910)
 Trypetimorpha canopus Linnavuori, 1973
 Trypetimorpha fenestrata Costa, 1862 - type species (mainland Europe, north Africa and the Middle East)
 Trypetimorpha japonica Ishihara, 1954
 Trypetimorpha occidentalis Huang & Bourgoin, 1993
 Trypetimorpha sizhengi Huang & Bourgoin, 1993
 Trypetimorpha wilsoni Huang & Bourgoin, 1993

References

External Links

Tropiduchinae
Hemiptera of Europe
Hemiptera of Africa
Hemiptera of Asia